Buchanan Lake Village is an unincorporated community and census-designated place in Llano County, Texas, United States. Its population was 692 as of the 2010 census.

Geography

The community is situated on the shores of Lake Buchanan.

References

Unincorporated communities in Llano County, Texas
Unincorporated communities in Texas
Census-designated places in Llano County, Texas
Census-designated places in Texas